In mathematics, the Langlands group is a conjectural group LF attached to each local or global field F, that satisfies properties similar to those of the Weil group. It was given that name by Robert Kottwitz. In Kottwitz's formulation, the Langlands group should be an extension of the Weil group by a compact group. When F is local archimedean, LF is the Weil group of F, when F is local non-archimedean, LF is the product of the Weil group of F with SU(2). When F is global, the existence of LF is still conjectural, though James Arthur gives a conjectural description of it. The Langlands correspondence for F is a "natural" correspondence between the irreducible n-dimensional complex representations of LF and, in the local case, the cuspidal automorphic representations of GLn(AF), where AF denotes the adeles of F.

Notes

References
 

Langlands program